Kolton Ryan Browning (born October 17, 1990) is an American football quarterback who is a free agent. He won a FXFL Championship with the Brooklyn Bolts in 2014. He was the starting quarterback for the ULM Warhawks from 2009 to 2013.

College career
After being redshirted in 2009, Browning took over as the Warhawks starting quarterback in 2010. In 2012, he was the Sun Belt Conference Offensive Player of the Year and led the Warhawks to their first ever bowl game against Ohio University in the Independence Bowl in Shreveport, Louisiana. During his career he threw for 10,263 yards and 81 touchdowns. He finished his career with most TD passes and is second in passing yards, completions, and attempts at ULM.

Professional career

Browning was briefly invited to training camp with the Dallas Cowboys, but was never officially signed.  He later signed with the Winnipeg Blue Bombers of the CFL, but was released soon afterwards to pursue a coaching opportunity.  In October 2014, Browning signed with the Brooklyn Bolts of the new formed Fall Experimental Football League(FXFL).

In 2015, Browning signed with the Mesquite Marshals of Champions Indoor Football for the 2016 season. On July 27, 2017, Browning re-signed with the Marshals. On April 19, 2018, Browning was released by the Marshals.

References

External links
 Louisiana–Monroe profile

1990 births
Living people
American football quarterbacks
Brooklyn Bolts players
Mesquite Marshals players
Louisiana–Monroe Warhawks football players
People from Mesquite, Texas
Players of American football from Texas